How to Be Single is a 2016 American romantic comedy film directed by Christian Ditter and written by Abby Kohn, Marc Silverstein and Dana Fox, based on the novel of the same name by Liz Tuccillo. It stars Dakota Johnson, Rebel Wilson, Damon Wayans Jr., Anders Holm, Alison Brie, Nicholas Braun, Jake Lacy, Jason Mantzoukas, and Leslie Mann, and follows a group of women in New York City who have different approaches on how to be single. The film was theatrically released in the United States on February 12, 2016, by Warner Bros. Pictures. It grossed $112 million worldwide and received mixed reviews from critics.

Plot
Alice temporarily dumps her college boyfriend Josh, moving to New York City to be a paralegal and live with her sister, Meg, an OB/GYN who has no interest in having a baby or relationship. Alice befriends wild Australian co-worker Robin, who enjoys partying and one-night stands, and local bartender Tom, who embraces the bachelor lifestyle and hooks up with several women, including Alice. Tom meets Lucy at his bar when she uses his Internet for free; she explains she is looking for "the one" using various dating sites.

Alice meets with Josh, ready to reconcile. He explains he is seeing someone else, which distresses her. Meg has a change of heart while watching over a baby, deciding to have a child of her own via a sperm donor.

Shortly after she becomes pregnant, Meg unexpectedly hooks up with a younger man, Ken, after meeting him at Alice's office Christmas party. He, the law office receptionist, is smitten with her. She tries to break it off, but he continues to pursue her cutely. Thinking Ken is too young for her to have a future with, Meg hides the pregnancy from him.

Back at Tom's bar, Lucy has a string of horrible dates, at which point he realizes he has feelings for her. In an attempt to put herself out there, Alice attends a networking event, where she hits it off with a man named David.

Lucy has been in a relationship for three weeks with Paul, who reveals he has been seeing other people, thinking she was doing the same, and breaks up with her. Lucy breaks down at her volunteer job reading to children at a bookstore. George, who works there, soothes her, and they begin a relationship.

Alice and Robin attend Josh's holiday party; Alice finds she cannot watch Josh with his new girlfriend. She runs into David, who shows her a private view of the Rockefeller Center Christmas Tree, dazzling her, and they begin a relationship. Three months later, as she is singing with David's daughter Phoebe, David becomes upset with her, reminding her that she is not Phoebe's mother. His wife died two years ago and he believes it is too soon for Phoebe to have a stepmother. They break up as a result.

Tom becomes upset with Lucy's relationship with George, and invites Alice to get drunk. They talk about their frustrations with their feelings for Josh and Lucy and sleep together to distract themselves. Ken discovers Meg is pregnant but is eager to help raise her child. She, fearing that he is not truly committed, ends the relationship.

At Alice's birthday party, Robin invites Tom, David, and Josh without Alice's knowledge, as she thought it would be funny. Shaken by the presence of all three men, Alice confronts Robin. Tom confesses his feelings to Lucy, but she announces she is engaged to George. Josh approaches Alice, and they make out but stop when he reveals to a horrified Alice that he is now engaged and was merely looking for closure with her.

Invigorated by a desire to find herself, Alice leaves to go home. Her cab hits Robin, who was trying to stop the cab for Meg, who is in labor. They rush to the hospital, where Meg gives birth to a baby girl. Ken convinces her to resume their relationship, while Alice rekindles her friendship with Robin.
 
The film closes with Alice reflecting on her time living alone and being single. Meg and Ken are together, while Robin continues her old habits. Tom opens up to the possibilities of non-casual relationships. Lucy marries George, and David talks to his daughter about her mom. Finally, Alice is seen exploring the Grand Canyon by herself to witness the sunrise on New Year's Day: a dream she'd always had.

Cast

 Dakota Johnson as Alice Kepley, Meg's sister and Robin's friend and co-worker
 Rebel Wilson as Robin, Alice's friend and co-worker
 Damon Wayans Jr. as David Stone, Alice's love interest
 Anders Holm as Tom, a bartender.
 Alison Brie as Lucy, she has online dating down to a science hoping to find her soul mate.
 Nicholas Braun as Josh, Alice's love interest
 Jake Lacy as Ken, Meg's love interest
 Jason Mantzoukas as George, works at the bookstore where Lucy volunteers to read at children.
 Leslie Mann as Meg Kepley, Alice's sister
 Colin Jost as Paul
 Brent Morin as Lucy's date

Production
The film rights for the Liz Tuccillo novel were purchased in 2008, the same year as the book's publication. Drew Barrymore was initially attached to direct  however she was replaced in 2013 with Christian Ditter.

Lily Collins was in early talks on February 24, 2014, to join the cast of the film. Alison Brie was in talks to join the film on June 19, 2014. Dakota Johnson, Rebel Wilson, and Leslie Mann were all cast in the film on January 29, 2015. Damon Wayans Jr. was added to the cast on March 6, 2015. Jason Mantzoukas and Nicholas Braun were also cast, on April 14, 2015; Braun played the love interest of Johnson's character, while Mantzoukas played the love interest of Brie's. Anders Holm was cast as Tom, and Saturday Night Live performer Colin Jost was also cast in a supporting role. Dan Stevens was also cast, but dropped out due to scheduling conflicts in favour of Beauty and The Beast.

Principal photography began on April 20, 2015, in New York City, and ended on June 25, 2015.

Release
How to Be Single grossed $46.8 million in the United States and Canada and $65.5 million in other territories for a worldwide total of $112.3 million, against a production budget of $38 million.

The film opened alongside Deadpool and Zoolander 2 and over its four-day President's Day opening weekend was projected to gross $20–25 million from 3,343 theaters. The film made $700,000 from its Thursday night previews and $5.3 million on its first day. It went on to gross $17.9 million in its opening weekend, finishing third at the box office behind Deadpool ($132.8 million) and Kung Fu Panda 3 ($19.8 million). In its second weekend the film grossed $8.2 million (a 54% drop), finishing fifth.

Reception
On Rotten Tomatoes the film holds an approval rating of 46% based on 157 reviews, with an average rating of 5.2/10. The site's critical consensus reads, "How to Be Single boasts the rough outline of a feminist rom-com, but too willingly indulges in the genre conventions it wants to subvert." On Metacritic, the film has a weighted average score of 51 out of 100 based on 32 critics, indicating "mixed or average reviews". Audiences polled by CinemaScore gave the film an average grade of "B" on an A+ to F scale. 
 
Richard Roeper of the Chicago Sun-Times gave the film three-and-a-half out of four stars, praising the film's supporting cast and script. Alonso Duralde of the TheWrap wrote:

Accolades
People's Choice Awards nominated How to Be Single as Favorite Comedic Movie, but it lost to Bad Moms.

References

External links

 
 
 
 
 

2016 films
2016 romantic comedy films
2010s buddy comedy films
2010s female buddy films
American buddy comedy films
American female buddy films
American romantic comedy films
Dune Entertainment films
2010s English-language films
Films based on American novels
Films set in New York City
Films shot in New York City
Flower Films films
Metro-Goldwyn-Mayer films
New Line Cinema films
Warner Bros. films
2010s American films